Lophopotamon is a genus of freshwater crab in the family Potamidae, containing only a single species, L. yenyuanense.

Distribution & habitat
Lophopotamon yenyuanense lives in rivers and streams in China's inland wetlands of Yanyuan.

Conservation
The species is currently classified as "Data Deficient" by the IUCN Red List, as its population size is unknown.

References

Crustaceans described in 1990
Monotypic decapod genera
Potamoidea